Reto Indergand (born 15 December 1991 in Altdorf) is a Swiss cyclist riding for the BMC Mountainbike Racing Team. He was on the start list for the 2018 Cross-country European Championship and he finished 5th.

Major results

2013
 1st  Cross-country, National Under-23 Championships
2015
 2nd  Team relay, UEC European Championships
2016
 1st  Overall Swiss Epic (with Lukas Flückiger)
 Swiss Bike Cup
1st Buchs
2017
 Swiss Bike Cup
1st Andermatt

References

1991 births
Living people
Swiss male cyclists
Swiss mountain bikers
People from the canton of Uri